Peter Jefferson was a bald eagle who lived at the Philadelphia Mint from  until 1836.  He became well known after a while and was let out of the Mint each night to fly around the city of Philadelphia.

Background on Bald Eagles 
The bald eagle (Haliaeetus leucocephalus) is a large bird in the Accipitridae family. They are the national bird of the United States and represent America. They are seen as a symbol of democracy, power and freedom. The bald eagle can be seen on many official US documents including passports, dollar bills and most notably, the back of all quarters. 

Their head is white making them “bald” and their feathered body and wings are dark brown. Their eyes, talons, and hooked beak are yellow. They are the second largest bird of prey and have a lengthy wingspan of about 168-244 cm. 

Bald eagles reside in forests close to bodies of water and prey. They can be spotted throughout the United States and Canada but particularly in colder climates up north.  Their diet varies by location but they mainly consume fish and small mammals. Bald eagles find their prey by sitting on a perch or soaring over the land, since they are able to see up to a mile. 

Pennsylvania is abundant with forests and water sources, making it a place where many eagles live. The city of Philadelphia, Peter’s hometown, is considered a great place to look for eagles due to its proximity to the Delaware River, a place to hunt for prey.

Life of Peter the Eagle 
In the mid-1830s, Peter the bald eagle became a known figure in the city of Philadelphia. Peter resided in the Philadelphia Mint, a contrast from an eagle’s typical habitat. Founded in 1792, The Philadelphia Mint was the first mint in the United States and responsible for the production of coins. 

During the day Peter would stay indoors and fly around the mint. The workers loved having Peter be alongside them. Peter was considered an exemplary employee of the Philadelphia Mint. Every night, Peter was let out and would fly around the city. He would return by morning before the workers arrived. 

While perched on a coining press one day, the machine suddenly started. His wing got caught in the coining press and he became badly injured and unable to fly. While many mint workers tried to help Peter, his wing was in too poor of a condition and he ultimately passed away.

Legacy 
To pay homage to Peter, the mint employees took him to get taxidermied.  He can be admired with his wings stretched out at the main entrance of the United States Mint to greet his visitors. He has been on display for over 150 years. Peter is said to have been the model for the image of an eagle on the silver dollars issued from 1836 to 1839 and the Flying Eagle cent of 1856-1858.

See also
 List of individual birds

References

1836 animal deaths
Individual eagles
Individual animals in the United States